Dezavand-e Sofla (also Romanized as Dezvand-e Soflá; also known as Dezāvand-e Pā’īn, Dezāvand-e Soflá, Dezeh Vand, Dezvand-e Pā’īn, Dīzawān, and Dīzeh Vand) is a village in Zherizhah Rural District, in the Central District of Sarvabad County, Kurdistan Province, Iran. At the 2006 census, its population was 75, in 21 families. The village is populated by Kurds.

References 

Towns and villages in Sarvabad County
Kurdish settlements in Kurdistan Province